Olegas Truchanas (22 September 1923 – 6 January 1972) was a Lithuanian-Australian conservationist and nature photographer.

He was a key figure in the attempt to stop the damming of the ecologically sensitive Lake Pedder in South West Tasmania by the Hydro Electricity Commission. His photographs, along with those of his protégé, Peter Dombrovskis, helped raise public awareness of the importance of the south-west Tasmania.

Early life
Truchanas was born in Lithuania. In 1941, he graduated from the Šiauliai Gymnasium. After the 1945 fall of Lithuania to the USSR, he fled to Munich, Germany. Though he enrolled in a law degree at UNRRA University, he was sent to a displaced persons camp, and subsequently migrated to Tasmania in 1948.

Upon arriving in Tasmania, Truchanas worked for a zinc company in Hobart for two years, as was necessary under Australian migration law of the time. At that time, he began to take an interest in the Tasmanian wilderness.

South West Tasmania
In 1958, Truchanas became the first person in recorded history to kayak the length of the dangerous Serpentine and Gordon Splits.

Most of Truchanas' early photographs were lost when his house was destroyed in the Hobart bushfire in 1967. However, over the next five years, he substantially rebuilt his collection of photos of the Lake Pedder area. Though, as a clerk temporarily employed by the Hydro Electricity Commission, Truchanas was forbidden to speak about the increasing controversy surrounding the impending damming, his photographs began to play an important role in publicity for the campaign. He was once quoted as stating "This vanishing world is beautiful beyond our dreams and contains in itself rewards and gratifications never found in an artificial landscape or man-made objects."

After taking what are now among the only remaining records of the pre-dam Lake Pedder, Truchanas realised that the campaign was lost, and turned his attention to the Pieman, Gordon and Franklin Rivers. In 1972, Truchanas drowned in the Gordon River after slipping and falling into the current. His body was found, trapped beneath a log, by Dombrovskis.

Legacy
He had lived to see the failure of the Lake Pedder and Pieman River campaigns, although the actual damming did not occur until after his death. However, the campaign to stop the Franklin Dam, and thus save the Gordon and Franklin rivers, was to be ultimately successful. After his death, a book of his work was published, with an initial print run of 5,000 copies. Eight further editions sold out.

Truchanas' and Dombrovskis' stories were depicted in a 2003 documentary, Wildness. In the same year, a tribute, The Forest of Stumps, by artist Geoff Parr, was exhibited at Hobart's Ten Days on the Island arts festival, including a number of Truchanas' photographs.

Some of his photographs have been turned into postage stamps by Australia Post, and a canoe used by Truchanas, and several other possessions, are part of the National Library of Australia's National Historical Collection. Singer-songwriter Bruce Watson stated, in his song Olegas,  "the Franklin runs today because of what [Truchanas] began."

In 2007 IHOS Music Theatre and Opera staged excerpts from a major opera, Olegas, based on the life of Olegas Truchanas. His work appeared in the 2013 photographic exhibition 'Into the Wild: Wilderness Photography in Tasmania' at the Queen Victoria Museum and Art Gallery in Launceston, Tasmania, and in the catalogue of this exhibition. His collection of colour slides, as well as an archival collection was donated to the Queen Victoria Museum and Art Gallery in 2014.  His work also appeared in the 2020 QVMAG exhibition 'Natural Visions: the camera and conservation'.

See also

 Death of a River Guide
 David Tatnall (photographer)

References

General references

External links
Gallery of photos by Truchanas and Dombrovskis
Pedder photograph collection held by the National Library of Australia

1923 births
1972 deaths
Australian environmentalists
Photographers from Tasmania
People from Hobart
Lithuanian emigrants to Australia
Nature photographers
Deaths by drowning in Australia
Accidental deaths in Tasmania
World War II refugees
People from Šiauliai